In mathematics, Schubert polynomials are generalizations of Schur polynomials that represent cohomology classes of Schubert cycles in flag varieties.

Background

 described the history of Schubert polynomials.

The Schubert polynomials  are polynomials in the variables  depending on an element  of the infinite symmetric group  of all permutations of  fixing all but a finite number of elements. They form a basis for the polynomial ring  in infinitely many variables.

The cohomology of the flag manifold  is  where  is the ideal generated by homogeneous symmetric functions of positive degree.

Properties

If  is the permutation of longest length in  then 

Schubert polynomials can be calculated recursively from these two properties. In particular, this implies that .

Other properties are

If  is the transposition , then .

If  for all , then  is the Schur polynomial  where  is the partition . In particular all Schur polynomials (of a finite number of variables) are Schubert polynomials.

Schubert polynomials have positive coefficients. A conjectural rule for their coefficients was put forth by Richard P. Stanley, and proven in two papers, one by Sergey Fomin and Stanley and one by Sara Billey, William Jockusch, and Stanley.

The Schubert polynomials can be seen as a generating function over certain combinatorial objects called pipe dreams or rc-graphs. These are in bijection with reduced Kogan faces, (introduced in the PhD thesis of Mikhail Kogan) which are special faces of the Gelfand-Tsetlin polytope.

 Schubert polynomials also can be written as a weighted sum of objects called bumpless pipe dreams. 

As an example

Multiplicative structure constants

Since the Schubert polynomials form a -basis, there are unique coefficients  
such that 

These can be seen as a generalization of the Littlewood−Richardson coefficients described by the Littlewood–Richardson rule.
For algebro-geometric reasons (Kleiman's transversality theorem of 1974), these coefficients are non-negative integers and it is an 
outstanding problem in representation theory and combinatorics to give a combinatorial rule for these numbers.

Double Schubert polynomials

The double Schubert polynomial  are characterized by the properties

 if .

The double Schubert polynomials can also be defined as 

.

Quantum Schubert polynomials

 introduced quantum Schubert polynomials, that have the same relation to the (small) quantum cohomology of flag manifolds that ordinary Schubert polynomials have to the ordinary cohomology.

Universal Schubert polynomials

 introduced universal Schubert polynomials, that generalize classical and quantum Schubert polynomials. He also described universal double Schubert polynomials generalizing double Schubert polynomials.

See also

Stanley symmetric function
Kostant polynomial
Monk's formula gives the product of a linear Schubert polynomial and a Schubert polynomial.
nil-Coxeter algebra

References

Representation theory
Symmetric functions
Algebraic combinatorics